Kshay (Hindi: क्षय, Corrode) is a 2012 black-and-white independent Indian psychological drama film written and directed by Karan Gour. The film premiered on 8 October 2011 at the Chicago International Film Festival. It went on to win several international awards like the Jury Award at the Indian Film Festival of Los Angeles. It was released in theatres in India on 15 June 2012.

Plot
A middle-class Indian housewife, Chhaya (Rasika Dugal) becomes obsessed with an expensive sculpture of the goddess Lakshmi and is determined to possess it despite the fact that she and her husband Arvind (Alekh Sangal) have little money.

Cast
Rasika Dugal as Chhaya
Alekh Sangal as Arvind
Sudhir Pednekar as Bapu
Adityavardhan Gupta as Sculptor
Nitika Anand as Shruti
Ashwin Baluja as Jamil
Siddharth Bhatia as Amay
Shalini Gupta as Woman in Market
Abhinay Khoparzi as Man on the Bus
Madhav as Construction Worker
Asit Redij as Asif
Shazeb Shaikh as Electrician

Production
The director Karan Gour used HDV and shot the film in color, later changing it to black and white in post-production.

Release and reception
After its premiere on 8 October 2011 at the Chicago International Film Festival, the film travelled to festivals like Indian Film Festival of Los Angeles, and South Asian International Film Festival. The film later saw a limited release at PVR Cinemas multiplexes starting 15 June 2012, followed by a DVD release. In its year end review, Mint called the film an "assured debut" while adding the film to the "top films of 2012".

Awards
2012 Jury Award for Best Feature at the Indian Film Festival of Los Angeles
2012 Asian New Talent Award for Best Film at the Shanghai International Film Festival

References

External links
 Kshay (Corrode), website
 

2010s Hindi-language films
Indian black-and-white films
Indian independent films
2010s psychological drama films
Films shot in Maharashtra
2012 directorial debut films
Indian psychological drama films
Indian avant-garde and experimental films
2010s avant-garde and experimental films
2012 independent films
2012 films